The Waterloo Jaycees Greater Waterloo Open Golf Classic is the oldest and largest golf tournament in the state of Iowa. It has been played annually since 1934, and celebrated its 75th anniversary in 2008. It is traditionally played over the course of third week/weekend in the month of July.

The tournament actually consists of five separate tournaments which are organized and run simultaneously by a volunteer committee of Waterloo Jaycees. The tournaments are played on the three public golf courses in Waterloo, Iowa.

Don Narveson Memorial Youth Golf Clinic
The Waterloo Open has become nearly a week-long event, and kicks off annually with the Don Narveson Memorial Youth Golf Clinic. The Youth Clinic takes place at South Hills Golf Course on Wednesday morning of the week of the event. Local youth interested in becoming more acquainted with the game of golf (as well as those who already play) can receive one-on-one interaction with golf professionals to refine their swing, receive putting instruction, and learn basic golf etiquette.

Pro-Am Tournament
The tournament itself begins on Thursday morning, when the Pro-Am tournament begins at Irv Warren Memorial golf course. The Waterloo Open receives sponsorship from many local and national businesses, and these sponsors' generosity is repaid partially by being invited to play a round of golf with a professional golfer. Groups of 5 (one professional with 4 amateurs/sponsors) tee it up on either Thursday or Friday. 

The professionals compete against each other for a special Pro-Am tournament purse. For those professionals who may not have played in the Waterloo Open before, the Pro-Am tournament serves as a practice round played on the course on which they will compete later that weekend in a competitive environment.

The amateur/sponsor groups also compete for nominal gift certificate prizes awarded to the best overall teams.

Amateur tournament
The Amateur and Senior Amateur tournaments begin on Friday the week of the event. The amateur field consists of 272 golfers, one half of which play at South Hills Golf Course on Friday, while the other one half play at Gates Park Golf Course. The groups switch courses on Saturday and play a second round of golf. After Saturday's round, the top 36 amateur golfers (and ties), along with the top 4 senior amateur golfers (and ties) make the cut and are invited to play a third championship round along with the professional golfers on Sunday at Irv Warren Golf Course. The amateur with the lowest combined 3-day score is the champion and receives a prize in the form of gift certificates redeemable at the local golf course pro shops.

Professional tournament
The main events of the Waterloo Open are the Professional and Senior Professional golf tournaments. 192 professionals compete in a one-day qualifying "shoot-out" on Saturday at Irv Warren Golf Course. After Saturday's round, a cut is made and the top 60 golfers in the Open division, as well as the top 20 golfers in the senior division, play a second round on Sunday for the championship.

Because of the Waterloo Open's relatively large top prize compared to other tournaments of its size ($40,000 to the golfer who wins in 2008) and its reputation as one of the most well-run and hospitable tournaments among professional golfers, it attracts many up-and-coming young golfers from all over the country. Golfers who have competed in the Waterloo Open include current PGA professionals Zach Johnson, Woody Austin, Tom Lehman, and George McNeill.

Winners

External links
Official site

Golf in Iowa
Recurring sporting events established in 1934
1934 establishments in Iowa